Swago Creek is a stream in the U.S. state of West Virginia.

Swago Creek derives its name by shortening Oswego.

See also
List of rivers of West Virginia

References

Rivers of Pocahontas County, West Virginia
Rivers of West Virginia